The Timber Creek Campground Comfort Stations are a set of three historic public toilet facilities in Rocky Mountain National Park.  Designed in 1935 by landscape architect Howard W. Baker of the National Park Service Branch of Plans and Designs, the National Park Service Rustic buildings were built with Civilian Conservation Corps labor in 1939.  They were added to the National Register of Historic Places on January 29, 1988.

See also
National Register of Historic Places listings in Grand County, Colorado

References

Park buildings and structures on the National Register of Historic Places in Colorado
Buildings and structures completed in 1939
National Register of Historic Places in Rocky Mountain National Park
National Park Service rustic in Colorado
Buildings and structures in Grand County, Colorado
Restrooms in the United States
National Register of Historic Places in Grand County, Colorado
1939 establishments in Colorado